WBHV-FM (94.5 MHz) is a radio station licensed to serve State College, Pennsylvania. The station is owned by Jim Loftus though his holding company Covenant Communications.

History
In 1987, WBHV was born as a Rock-40 alternative to WQWK – which aired at that time as a top-40 station. Shortly thereafter, WQWK switched back to its "QWK Rock" format and B103 moved into the top-40 niche in State College, Pennsylvania.

During the 1980s and 1990s, the station was generally referred to as B-103 (The Beaver), as its prior frequency was at 103.1 FM, where WOWY is currently broadcasting from. In terms of branding, WBHV initially identified itself as "B103 – The Beaver."

In the late '90s, the station changed its branding to "Beaver 103." In the early 2000s, the branding changed back to "103.1 – The Beaver" with an on-air lineup including mornings with Joe Thomas and Pam Bunch, middays with Glenn Turner and afternoons with Rob Tanner taking over the top spot in the State College ratings.

In 2006, after a few years off the air, WBHV was reborn in State College at 94.5 FM. Notable air talent at "The Original Bee" included Mike Maze, Paul Kraimer, "Doc" Livingston, Ronnie Fox, Dave Dallow, Marc Bishop, John Lorinc, Jeff Daniels, Joe Myers, Benjy Bronk, Jim Richards, Timmy D, Kevin Kral, David Hilton, Ross Cannon, Tommy Edwards, Captain Kevin Collins, Pat Kain and Steve Hilton.

On December 30, 2022 it was announced that top 40/CHR format would move to WRSC as "Pop Radio" within days.

On January 3, 2023 WBHV-FM dropped its top 40/CHR format and began stunting.

Frequency history
Previous stations broadcasting to State College on the 94.5 FM frequency include WGGY (1991–1992), WFGI (1992–2001), adult contemporary WLTS (2001–2006), and WSMO (February–August 2006). The call letters were officially changed to WBHV-FM on August 29, 2006.

Previous logo

References

External links

On the Radio – State College, PA

BHV-FM